HR 273 is a chemically peculiar spectroscopic binary system in the northern circumpolar constellation of Cassiopeia. It has an apparent visual magnitude of 5.9 making it faintly visible to the naked eye from dark suburban skies. Parallax measurements with the Hipparcos spacecraft put this system at a distance of roughly 350 light years.

The primary, HR 273 A, is an Ap star and the secondary is an Am star, making this a very unusual binary system. The primary has a magnetic field of 65 gauss, amongst the weakest seen in any Ap star. The magnetic field in the secondary is too weak to detect.

Component A has a spectral type of A0 III, and has unusually strong lines of strontium, chromium, and europium so it is known as a SrCrEu star. Although some spectral lines of the secondary star can be clearly distinguished, its spectral type cannot be clearly assigned. It is thought to be a late class A star, cooler than the primary. The primary star has been rotationally braked so that its rotational period closely matches its orbital period.

References

Cassiopeia (constellation)
0273
005550
004572
BD+65 0115
Spectroscopic binaries
Ap stars
A-type giants
Am stars